Jon Kelly is a British audio engineer and record producer, who began his career as an engineer at Air London Studios. He has produced albums and singles for Chris Rea, the Damned, Kate Bush (where he co-produced with Bush on her third album Never for Ever), Pele, the Beautiful South, Prefab Sprout, Deacon Blue, Heather Nova, Rosalie Deighton, the Levellers, Fish, Lynsey de Paul, Mickey Joe Harte, Nolwenn Leroy and Richard Ashcroft. He also mixed several tracks on Tori Amos's debut album, Little Earthquakes.

References

Year of birth missing (living people)
Living people
English record producers
English audio engineers